Mount Salem is a Dispersed Rural Community and unincorporated place in the municipal township of Malahide, Elgin County in southwestern Ontario, Canada.

The community has two churches, Sommerfeld Mennonite Church and Mount Salem Evangelical Mennonite Church, and Mount Salem Christian School, a JK–12 primary and secondary interdenominational Christian school that uses the facilities of the aforementioned two churches.

References

Communities in Elgin County